Bucknor is a surname. Notable people with the surname include:

C. B. Bucknor (born 1962), Jamaican basketball umpire
Funke Bucknor-Obruthe (born 1976), Nigerian businessman and lawyer
Jermaine Bucknor (born 1983), Canadian basketball player
Kofi Bucknor (1953–2017), Ghanaian actor 
Kofoworola Bucknor (born 1939), Nigerian politician
Matt Bucknor (born 1985), Canadian football player
Richard Bucknor (born 1966), Jamaican hurdler
Sean Bucknor (born 1984), American-born Jamaican footballer
Segun Bucknor (1946–2017), Nigerian musician
Steve Bucknor (born 1946), Jamaican cricket umpire
Tosyn Bucknor (1981–2018), Nigerian actress